This is a list of films produced by the Ollywood film industry based in Bhubaneshwar and Cuttack in 1994:

A-Z

References

1994
Ollywood
1990s in Orissa
1994 in Indian cinema